A discretionary trust, in the trust law of England, Australia, Canada and other common law jurisdictions, is a trust where the beneficiaries and/or their entitlements to the trust fund are not fixed, but are determined by the criteria set out in the trust instrument by the settlor. It is sometimes referred to as a family trust in Australia or New Zealand. Where the discretionary trust is a testamentary trust, it is common for the settlor (or testator) to leave a letter of wishes for the trustees to guide them as to the settlor's wishes in the exercise of their discretion. Letters of wishes are not legally binding documents.

Discretionary trusts can only arise as express trusts. It is not possible for a constructive trust or a resulting trust to arise as a discretionary trust.

Forms
Discretionary trusts can be discretionary in two respects. First, the trustees usually have the power to determine which beneficiaries (from within the class) will receive payments from the trust. Second, trustees can select the amount of trust property that the beneficiary receives. Although most discretionary trusts allow both types of discretion, either can be allowed on its own. It is permissible in most legal systems for a trust to have a fixed number of beneficiaries and for the trustees to have discretion as to how much each beneficiary receives, or to have a class of beneficiaries from whom they could select members, but provide that the amount to be provided is fixed.  Most well-drafted trust instruments also provide for a power to add or exclude beneficiaries from the class; this allows the trustees greater flexibility to deal with changes in circumstances (and, in particular, changes in the revenue laws of the applicable jurisdiction).

Characteristically, discretionary trusts provide for a discretionary distribution of income only, but in some cases the trustees also have a power of appointment with respect to the capital in the trust, i.e. the corpus.

Discretionary trusts are usually sub-divided into two types:
 exhaustive, where the trustees must distribute all income accruing to the trust fund; and
 non-exhaustive, where the trustees have an express power to accumulate income.

Analysis
In a fixed trust the beneficiary has a specific proprietary right in relation to the trust fund.  Each beneficiary of a discretionary trust, in contrast, is dependent upon the trustees to exercise their power of selection favourably. In Gartside v IRC [1968] AC 553 the Inland Revenue argued that as each beneficiary might be entitled to income from the trust fund, each should be charged as if he were entitled to the whole of the fund. Perhaps unsurprisingly, the House of Lords rejected this argument. Even where there is a sole member of the class remaining, so long as there is a possibility that another member of the class could come into existence, that member is not considered a sole beneficiary for purposes of taxation liability.

Gartside v IRC concerned a non-exhaustive discretionary trust; however, in Re Weir's Settlement [1969] 1 Ch 657 and Sainsbury v IRC [1970] Ch 712, the courts held that the same analysis was equally applicable to exhaustive discretionary trusts.

The rights of individual beneficiaries under a discretionary trust being uncertain, it was open to question to what extent the beneficiaries of a discretionary trust (if all of adult age and sound mind) could utilise the rule in Saunders v Vautier. It had been held that beneficiaries under a discretionary trust could do so, although that authority was decided pre-McPhail v Doulton, where to be valid the trustees had to be able to draw up a "complete list" of beneficiaries. That notwithstanding, leading commentators have suggested that provided all of the beneficiaries could be ascertained, they should still retain the right to terminate the trust under the rule, so long as it is an exhaustive discretionary trust.

Duties
The ordinary correlation between beneficiaries' rights and trustees' duties which arises in fixed trusts is absent in discretionary trusts. Although there are clearly duties, it is less clear whether there are any correlating rights. However, it seems clear that the trustees' duty is limited to (a) determining whether to exercise their discretion, and (b) exercising their discretion lawfully under the terms of the trust. Whilst the beneficiaries will have standing to sue the trustees for failing to fulfill their duties, it is not clear that they would gain by such action.

In Re Locker's Settlement [1977] 1 WLR 1323 the trustees of a discretionary trust did not make any distributions for a number of years based upon the expressed wishes of the settlor. The trust then fell dormant, and after several more years, the trustees sought directions. The court held that their discretionary powers continued, and that they should exercise it in respect of the dormant years now as they should have done at the time. The court reaffirmed that if trustees refuse to distribute income, or refuse to exercise their discretion, although the court could not compel it be exercised in a particular manner, it could order that the trustees be replaced.

The position with a duty to consider exercising discretion in non-exhaustive discretionary trusts is more complicated, as the duty to exercise discretion can be satisfied by deciding to accumulate.

Purposes
Discretionary trusts still serve a useful function, despite their original source of popularity (tax savings) having diminished in most countries. They still continue to be used for these reasons, among others:
 to protect improvident beneficiaries against creditors – as the beneficiary has no claim to any specific part of the trust fund, none of the trust fund is vulnerable to attachment by the trustee in bankruptcy of any beneficiary
 to exercise control over young or improvident beneficiaries
 to create flexibility to react to changes in circumstances
 in certain jurisdictions, a discretionary trust can be used to protect family assets from forming part of any divorce settlement.

Popularity and decline
The popularity of discretionary trusts rose sharply after the decision of the House of Lords in McPhail v Doulton [1971] AC 424 where Lord Wilberforce restated the test for certainty of objects in connection with discretionary trusts. Previously, it had been understood that for the trust to be valid, the trustees had to be able to draw up a "complete list" of all the possible beneficiaries, and if they could not do so, the trust was void.  But Lord Wilberforce held that provided it could be said of any person whether they were "in or out" of the class, as described by the settlor, the trust would be valid.

Because under a discretionary trust, no one beneficiary could be said to have title to any trust assets prior to a distribution, this made discretionary trusts a powerful weapon for tax planners. Inevitably, the surge in popularity has led to a legislative response in most jurisdictions, thus in many countries there are now considerable tax disadvantages to discretionary trusts, which has predictably hampered their use outside the scope of charitable trusts. In the United Kingdom, for example, the Finance Act 1975 imposed a "capital transfer tax" on any property settled on a discretionary trust, which was replaced in the Finance Act 1988 by the inheritance tax.

See also
Taxation of trusts (United Kingdom)
Personal injury trust

Notes

References

Wills and trusts